Kootingal is a town in New South Wales, Australia in the Tamworth Regional Council area. It is commonly called a satellite suburb of Tamworth because of its closeness and the fact that its residents use Tamworth's services.  Founded as an Aboriginal mission, Kootingal traces its name roots to the local Aboriginal Kamilaroi language. At the 2021 census, Kootingal had a population of 2,313 people.

It is an agricultural based town, with lucerne, fruit, vegetable, chicken and egg farms. It is nestled in a small rich alluvial valley in the Moonbi Range, part of the Great Dividing Range. Kootingal is located on the northern bank of a bend in the Cockburn River. Kootingal is located between the villages of Moonbi to the north and Nemingha to the south. It is located 474 km north west of Sydney and 20 km north east of Tamworth on the New England Highway.

Kootingal holds an annual Pumpkin Festival and Outdoor Leisure Show in April at the Kootingal sports ground. There are a variety of stalls and the show is suitable for all ages.

Heritage listings
Kootingal has a number of heritage-listed sites, including:
 New England Highway: Moonby House

Services
Bowling Club
Comprehensive IGA Supermarket, Liquor Store & Newsagent (same family since 1912)
Caravan Park
Catholic and Anglican Churches
Kootingal Public School
Moonbi House Retirement Village
Motel
Police Station
Post Office
Railway Station
Swimming Pool
Sportsground
Tennis Courts
War Memorial Hall, Library and Pre-School
Fuel Station & Cafe
North Store – Kootingal

Kootingal station is situated on the Main North railway line. Trains no longer continue all the way to the Queensland border, but the town is still served twice daily by the NSW TrainLink Xplorer service between Sydney and Armidale in both directions. This station is less than 20 minutes drive from Tamworth.

Scouts
Kootingal has a Scout group in combination with the village of Moonbi. The Kootingal-Moonbi Scout group consists of Joey Scouts, Cub Scouts and Scouts. It is a thriving Group and enjoys many activities.

References

External links
Information Guide to Kootingal
Kootingal Public School
Kootingal News

Towns in New South Wales
Towns in New England (New South Wales)
Kootingal, New South Wales